The 2016–17 ISU Challenger Series was held from September to December 2016. It was the third season of a group of senior-level international figure skating competitions ranked below the Grand Prix series.

Regulations 
Skaters may enter a maximum of three competitions. After the starting orders are drawn for the short segment, skaters are considered as entered even if they withdraw. With the exception of the host, member nations are limited to three entries per discipline at each event.

The International Skating Union requires each Challenger Series competition to include a minimum of three disciplines (from men's singles, ladies' singles, pair skating, and ice dancing), at least ten countries represented in all disciplines combined, and a minimum number of entries and countries in each discipline.

Schedule 
The 2016–17 series was composed of nine events. The Ukrainian Open was originally scheduled for 9–13 November 2016, as the seventh of ten competitions, but the International Skating Union listed it as cancelled on 20 September.

Medal summary

Men

Ladies

Pairs

Ice dance

Medal standings

Challenger Series rankings
The ISU Challenger Series rankings were formed by combining the two highest final scores of each skater or duo.

Men

Ladies

Pairs

Ice dance

Top scores in Challenger Series

Men 

Best total score

Ladies 
Best total score

Pairs 

Best total score

Ice dance 

Best total score

Points and prize money

Points 
At each event, skaters who finished in the top eight in each singles category, top five in pairs, and top six in ice dancing received points toward their ISU world standings:

Prize money 
Skaters who finished in the top three in the final Challenger Series standings received prize money:

References

External links 
 ISU Challenger Series at the International Skating Union

Challenger
ISU Challenger Series